CPS Energy (formerly "City Public Service Board of San Antonio") is the municipal electric utility serving the city of San Antonio, Texas. Acquired by the city in 1942, CPS Energy serves over 840,750 electricity customers and more than 352,585 natural gas customers in its  service area, which includes Bexar County and portions of its 7 surrounding counties.

History
 1917 – San Antonio Public Service Company formed; owned by American Light and Traction
 1942 – City purchases SAPSCo for $34 million  It became known as City Public Service.
 2005 – City Public Service (or simply CPS) officially rebrands to CPS Energy.
 2010 – J.K. Spruce 2 begins operation with more than $250 million of the best available emissions-control equipment
 2012 – Rio Nogales, a combined-cycle natural gas plant in Seguin, is acquired as part of strategic plan to increase low carbon fuels, and to proactively save half-a-billion dollars by not investing in Deely, the oldest coal-fired unit
2017 – CPS Energy celebrated 75 years of being owned by the City of San Antonio.
2018 – CPS Energy decommissioned J.T. Deely #1 and #2 Coal fired power plants in late December, ending 42 years of service.

Generation sources
As of May 2015, CPS Energy had 1,059 megawatts of wind and 444 megawatts of solar power under contract.

Former: J.T. Deely Power Plant Unit 1, 486 MW, 1977–2018, coal, demolished. J.T. Deely Power Plant Unit 2, 446 MW, 1978–2018, coal, demolished. W.B. Tuttle power plant, 425 MW, 1954–2011, natural gas, demolished. and Comal Power Plant, 70 MW, 1925–1973, coal then natural gas, redeveloped.

Governing structure
CPS Energy is governed by a five-member Board of Trustees. The Mayor of San Antonio serves as an ex officio member, for as long as they are the Mayor. Each of the other four members represents a geographical quadrant within the city, and must reside within that quadrant. They are nominated by the remaining trustees for a five-year term, with eligibility to serve one additional term. The nominations must be approved by majority vote of the San Antonio City Council.

In addition, a 15-member Citizens Advisory Committee serves as a liaison between CPS Energy and the citizens of San Antonio.  Ten of the members are nominated by the ten City Council members (one from each district), while the remaining five are chosen from applicants who are interviewed by the Board.  The Board approves all fifteen members, who must reside in the CPS Energy service territory and be customers of CPS Energy as well.

See also
 Public service company

References

External links
 CPS Energy website

Municipal electric utilities of the United States
Natural gas companies of the United States
Companies based in San Antonio
Government of San Antonio